Luis Miguel is the self-titled nineteenth studio album released worldwide by Mexican pop singer Luis Miguel on 14 September 2010. This album celebrates the singer's 30 years in music.

Album history
This is the first studio album of the artist since Cómplices. There were rumours of the possible title of this album since March, but neither the name or the new album were confirmed by the artist of by Warner Music. But, on 26 July, there were reports that mentioned that the album would be released between August and September, and that the title of the album and the main single would be Labios de Miel. The artist's webpage confirmed the main single, and set its release for 3 August, with its videoclip set to be released on late August. Also, confirmed that the album would be released on 14 September. The cover and the title of the album were not revealed.

The single Labios de Miel managed to debut at #1 on most of the Mexican charts, and to be one of the most downloaded songs in iTunes Music Store.

On 5 August, the title was officially revealed, so as the cover. Afterwards, the album was put on presale by many different music stores, so as many internet sites. As for its physical sales in the U.S., "Luis Miguel" made its debut atop of the Latin Album Charts and at number 45 on the Top 200 Albums by Billboard with first-week sales exceeding 9,000 copies.

Track listing

Tour
Luis Miguel Tour 2010/12 is a concert tour performed by Luis Miguel. This tour began at Caesars palace on 15 September 2010 and has toured 20 countries.

Personnel
Adapted from the Luis Miguel liner notes:

Performance credits

Lalo Carrillo - bass 
Victor Loyo - drums 
Henry Gutiérrez - guitar , rhythm arrangements & programming 
George Doering - guitar 
Steve Lukather - guitar solo 
Francisco Loyo - keyboards , synth solo , arrangements , programming 
Alejandro Carballo - keyboards , electric piano , trombone , arrangements & programming 
Andrés Peláez - keyboards 
Salo Loyo - keyboards 
Robbie Buchanan - electric piano 
Jorge Calandrelli - electric piano, strings arrangements 
Tommy Aros - percussion 
Jerry Hey - brass arrangements 
Gary Grant - trumpet 
Dan Fornero - trumpet 
Arturo Solar - trumpet 
Ramón Flores - trumpet solo 
Dan Higgins - saxophone , tenor saxophone 
Jeff Nathanson - baritone saxophone 
Bill Reichenbach - trombone 
Bill Ross - strings arrangements 
Mark Kibble - chorus arrangements 
Take 6 - chorus 
Kenny O'Brien - chorus 
Carlos Murguía - chorus 
Will Wheaton - chorus 
Giselda Vatcky - chorus 
Bambi Jones - chorus 
Terry Wood - chorus 
Sergio Granados - chorus 
Edgar Cortazar - chorus

Technical credits

Luis Miguel - producer
Moogie Canazio - engineer, mixer
David Reitzas - audio mixing
Ron McMaster - mastering engineer
Shari Sutcliffe - production coordinator
Bill Ross - orchestra director
Alejandro Carballo - orchestra director
Jorge Calandrelli - orchestra director
Francisco Loyo - pre-production and programming
Salo Loyo - pre-production and programming
Pete Rauls - recording assistant and mixing
Ghazi Hourani - recording assistant and mixing
Mimi "Audia" Parker - recording assistant and mixing
Mitch Kenny - recording assistant and mixing
Julian Peploe Studio - graphic design

Charts

Chart positions

Year-end charts

Sales and certifications

See also
 List of number-one albums of 2010 (Mexico)
 List of number-one albums of 2010 (Spain)
 List of number-one Billboard Latin Pop Albums of 2010
 List of number-one Billboard Latin Albums from the 2010s

References

External links
 Official site of the artist

Luis Miguel albums
2010 albums
Warner Music Latina albums
Spanish-language albums
Albums produced by Luis Miguel